Juliet R. V. Barker FRSL (born 1958) is an English historian, specialising in the Middle Ages and literary biography.  She is the author of a number of well-regarded works on the Brontës, William Wordsworth, and medieval tournaments. From 1983 to 1989 she was the curator and librarian of the Bronte Parsonage Museum.

Barker was educated at Bradford Girls' Grammar School and St Anne's College, Oxford, where she gained her doctorate in medieval history.

Selected works
 The Brontës: Selected Poems
 The Tournament in England: 1100–1400 (1986) Woodbridge, England:The Boydell Press, ISBN|0-85115-942-7
 The Brontë Yearbook
 The Brontës (1994)
 The Brontës: A Life in Letters (1997) 
 Charlotte Brontë: Juvenilia 1829–35
 Wordsworth: A Life (2000) 
 Wordsworth: A Life in Letters (2002) 
 Agincourt: The King, the Campaign, the Battle (2005), UK: Little, Brown ISBN|0-349-11918-X
 The Deafening Sound of Silent Tears: The Story of Caring For Life (2007)
 Conquest: The English Kingdom of France 1417-50 (2009) London: Little, Brown
 England Arise: The People, the King and the Great Revolt of 1381 (2014)
 Drops into an Ocean: Continuing the story of Caring For Life (2017)
 1381: The Year of the Peasants’ Revolt (2014)

Collaborations
 with Richard Barber: Tournaments: Jousts, Chivalry and Pageants in the Middle Ages (1989)The Boydell Press, ISBN 0-85115-470-0

Honours and awards
In 1999 she was awarded an honorary Doctorate of Letters by the University of Bradford. 
She is a Fellow of the Royal Society of Literature.

"The Brontes" won the Yorkshire Post Book Award and was short-listed for both the AT&T Non-Fiction Prize and the Marsh Biography Award.

Footnotes

External links
Juliet Barkers Official Web Page launched September 2009

 Juliet Barker on Goodreads

1958 births
Living people
English literary historians
Fellows of the Royal Society of Literature
Historians of English literature
British medievalists
Women medievalists
Alumni of St Anne's College, Oxford
British military historians
People educated at Bradford Girls' Grammar School
Women literary historians
British women historians
British women curators